Events from the year 1915 in Croatia.

Incumbents
 Monarch – Franz Joseph I
 Ban of Croatia – Iván Skerlecz

Events

Arts and literature

Sport

Births
March 10 – Joža Horvat, writer (died 2012)
March 12 – Bruno Knežević, footballer (died 1982)
April 8 – Ivan Supek, physicist (died 2007)
June 5 – Vojin Bakić, sculptor (died 1992)
September 27 – Milan Antolković, footballer (died 2007)

Deaths
August 12 – Marcel Kiepach, inventor (born 1894)

References

 
Years of the 20th century in Croatia
Croatia